Offset is the second extended play by South Korean singer Chungha. It was released by MNH Entertainment and distributed by CJ E&M Music on January 17, 2018.

Release 
The EP was released on January 17, 2018, through several music portals, including MelOn and iTunes.

Commercial performance 
Offset debuted and peaked at number 3 on the Gaon Album Chart on the week January 20, 2018. In its second week, the EP fell to number 49 and to number 55 a week later. The EP charted sixth consecutive weeks on the chart. The EP also debuted and peaked at number 13 on the US World Albums chart on the week ending January 27, 2018.

The EP was the 26th best-selling album of January 2018, with 11,102 physical copies sold and the 100th best selling-album in the first half of 2018 with 13,751 copies sold.

Track listing 
Digital download/CD

Charts

Release history

References 

2018 EPs
Chungha albums
Korean-language EPs